Ali Kajo (born 1941 or 1942) was a Kenyan footballer who played as a forward. He was capped 32 times by the Kenya national team and scored 26 goals. During his club career, he played for Feisal, where he won the 1965 Kenya National Football League.

References

Year of birth missing
1940s births
2020 deaths
Kenyan footballers
Sportspeople from Mombasa
Association football forwards
Kenya international footballers